Najas gracillima, the slender waternymph, is a submerged species of aquatic plant in the Hydrocharitaceae family. found in lakes and streams. It is native to China (Fujian, Guangxi, Guizhou, Hainan, Hebei, Hubei, Jiangxi, Jilin, Liaoning, Nei Mongol, Taiwan, Yunnan, Zhejiang), Russian Far East (Amur and Khabarovsk), Japan, Korea, Taiwan, Iran, Alberta, Ontario, Newfoundland, Nova Scotia, New Brunswick, the eastern United States (every state east of the Mississippi River except Florida, plus Minnesota, Iowa, Missouri and the District of Columbia). It is also considered introduced and naturalized in France, Spain, Italy and California (Plumas and Tehama Counties).

Najas gracillima is a small aquatic annual with branching stems. The unisexual flowers ( each flower is only one sex) are produced in the axils of the branchlets and bases of the leaf sheaths.  It is listed as endangered in Minnesota. It lives in soft-water lakes and ponds with mud and silt bottoms, and appears to be sensitive to water turbidity, warming, and eutrophication.

References

External links
Photo of herbarium specimen at Missouri Botanical Garden, collected in Missouri

gracillima
Aquatic plants
Plants described in 1867
Flora of Iran
Flora of China
Flora of Spain
Flora of Japan
Flora of Korea
Flora of Canada
Flora of the United States
Flora of Fujian
Flora of Guangxi
Flora of Guizhou
Flora of Hainan
Flora of Russia
Flora of Hebei
Flora of France
Flora of Hubei
Flora of Jiangxi
Flora of Liaoning
Flora of Italy
Flora of Inner Mongolia
Flora of Taiwan
Flora of Yunnan
Flora of Zhejiang
Taxa named by Alexander Braun
Taxa named by George Engelmann
Taxa named by Paul Wilhelm Magnus